Conus splendidulus, common name the clay cone, is a species of sea snail, a marine gastropod mollusk in the family Conidae, the cone snails and their allies.

Like all species within the genus Conus, these snails are predatory and venomous. They are capable of "stinging" humans, therefore live ones should be handled carefully or not at all.

Description
The size of the shell varies between 43 mm and 70 mm. The shell has an olive-brown, or ash color, with a white central band, and usually another obsolete one below the shoulder-angle, encircled by numerous chestnut and white articulated lines. The spire is maculated with chestnut. The aperture has a light chocolate color with a central white band.

Distribution
This marine species occurs in the Gulf of Aden, off Northern Somalia and off the Laccadives.

References

  Petit, R. E. (2009). George Brettingham Sowerby, I, II & III: their conchological publications and molluscan taxa. Zootaxa. 2189: 1–218
 Puillandre N., Duda T.F., Meyer C., Olivera B.M. & Bouchet P. (2015). One, four or 100 genera? A new classification of the cone snails. Journal of Molluscan Studies. 81: 1-23

External links
 The Conus Biodiversity website
 Cone Shells - Knights of the Sea
 

splendidulus
Gastropods described in 1833
Taxa named by George Brettingham Sowerby I